The Ministry of Energy is a Cabinet-level agency of the government of the Canadian province of Alberta responsible for coordinating policy relating to the development of mineral and energy resources. It is also responsible for assessing and collecting non-renewable resource (NRR) royalties, freehold mineral taxes, rentals, and bonuses. The Alberta Petroleum Marketing Commission, which is fully integrated with the Department of Energy within the ministry, and fully funded by the Crown, accepts delivery of the Crown's royalty share of conventional crude oil and sells it at the current market value.  The current ministry was formed in 1986, but ministries with other names dealing with energy resources go back to the Ministry of Lands and Mines in 1930.

The Alberta Energy and Utilities Board regulated energy resource development, pipelines, transmission lines, and investor-owned electric, water, and natural gas utilities, as well as certain municipality-owned utilities. It reported to the Executive Council through the Ministry of Energy, although it operated and made its formal decisions independently and autonomously. On January 1, 2008 the Alberta Energy and Utilities Board (EUB) was realigned into two separate regulatory bodies:
the Energy Resources Conservation Board (ERCB), which regulates the oil and gas industry, and 
the Alberta Utilities Commission (AUC), which regulates the utilities industry.

History 

In 1984, the Alberta Department of Energy and Natural Resources (ENR), was a complex multi-divisional organization, with a permanent staff of 2, 605 and a budget of $499 million, that was responsible for the management of energy, mineral, forest and fish and wildlife resources as well as public (crown owned lands) which constituted 62% of Alberta's land base. ENR policy was based on the premise that with proper planning and management, land can support a variety of uses, such as, timber, recreation and wildlife.  However few were ideally compatible creating a climate of competition and conflict.

In 1986 the Department of Energy and the Department of Forestry, Lands and Wildlife were created. The original resource agencies continued and interdepartmental planning took place under Resource Evaluation and Planning (REAP). The Resource Evaluation and Planning (REAP) division was created in 1976 to provide coordination and data gathering services.

In the 1980s REAP oversaw an integrative planning system using a team approach to decision-making.  It was a challenging time of transition. More established agencies like the Alberta Forest Service supported preservation of traditional attitudes and behaviour and felt threatened. By the 1980s Alberta Forest Service had a strong authority system with a military style chain of command and system of ranks.  Fish and Wildlife Division were more flexible and less formally structured. Public Lands were more bureaucratic and mechanistic.

The Fish and Wildlife division who emphasized long-term research and monitoring are under the auspices of the Fish and Wildlife Act. Fish and Wildlife division were with the Department of Recreation and Parks before joining Energy and Natural Resources (ENR) in 1979.

The Mineral Resources division had very high status and power because of their client groups, which included the oil and gas industry, who are "powerful actors on the Alberta scene."

In 1982 the Alberta Forest Service had a staff of 765 and a budget of $123 million and the Fish and Wildlife division whose clients were often environmental groups, had 414 positions and $20 million.

Non-Renewable Resource Royalties

Royalty rates in Alberta are based on the price of WTI.  That royalty rate is applied to a project's Net Revenue if the project has reached payout or Gross Revenue if the project has not yet reached payout.  A project's revenue is a direct function of the price it is able to sell its crude for.  Since WCS is a benchmark for oil sands crudes, revenues in the oil sands are discounted when the price of WCS is discounted.  Those price discounts flow through to the royalty payments.

The Province of Alberta receives a portion of benefits from the development of energy resources in the form of royalties that fund in part programs like health, education and infrastructure.

In 2006-7 the oil sands royalty revenue was $2.411 billion. In 2007/08 it rose to $2.913 billion and it continued to rise in 2008/09 to $2.973 billion.

In their response to the 2010 competitive review with input from the Canadian Association of Petroleum Producers (CAPP) and the Small Explorers and Producers Association of Canada, Alberta Energy lowered non-renewable resource (NRR) royalty rates.

The rate cuts included,

In 2010 the oil and gas industry accounted for 30 percent of Alberta's GDP and 147,000 direct jobs. The decision to lower royalty rates to make the NRR industries more competitive was based on the economic argument that the decrease in royalties revenue would be offset by an increase in land sales and tax revenue.

Following the revised Alberta Royalty Regime it fell in 2009/10 to $1.008 billion. In that year Alberta's total resource revenue "fell below $7 billion...when the world economy was in the grip of recession."

In February 2012 the Province of Alberta "expected $13.4 billion in revenue from non-renewable resources in 2013-14. By January 2013 the province was anticipating only $7.4 billion. "30 per cent of Alberta's approximately $40-billion budget is funded through oil and gas revenues. Bitumen royalties represent about half of that total." In 2009/10 royalties from the oil sands amounted to $1.008 billion (Budget 2009 cited in Energy Alberta 2009.

In order to accelerate development of the oil sands, the federal and provincial governments more closely aligned taxation of the oil sands with other surface mining resulting in "charging one per cent of a project's gross revenues until the project's investment costs are paid in full at which point rates increased to 25 per cent of net revenue. These policy changes and higher oil prices after 2003 had the desired effect of accelerating the development of the oil sands industry. "A revised Alberta Royalty Regime was implemented on January 1, 2009. through which each oil sands project pays a gross revenue royalty rate of 1% (Oil and Gas Fiscal Regimes 2011:30). Oil and Gas Fiscal Regimes 2011 summarizes the petroleum fiscal regimes for the western provinces and territories. The Oil and Gas Fiscal Regimes described how royalty payments were calculated:

When the price of oil per barrel is less than or equal to $55/bbl indexed against West Texas Intermediate (WTI) (Oil and Gas Fiscal Regimes 2011:30)(Indexed to the Canadian dollar price of West Texas Intermediate (WTI) (Oil and Gas Fiscal Regimes 2011:30) to a maximum of 9%). When the price of oil per barrel is less than or equal to $120/ bbl indexed against West Texas Intermediate (WTI) "payout."

Payout refers "the first time when the developer has recovered all the allowed costs of the project, including a return allowance on those costs equal to the Government of Canada long-term bond rate ["LTBR"].

In order to encourage growth and prosperity and due to the extremely high cost of exploration, research and development, oil sands and mining operations pay no corporate, federal, provincial taxes or government royalties other than personal income taxes as companies often remain in a loss position for tax and royalty purposes for many years. Defining a loss position becomes increasingly complex when vertically-integrated multi-national energy companies are involved. Suncor claims their realized losses were legitimate and that Canada Revenue Agency (CRA) is unfairly claiming "$1.2-billion" in taxes which is jeopardizing their operations.

Oil Sands Royalty Rates 

"Bitumen Valuation Methodology (BVM) is a method to determine for royalty purposes a value for bitumen produced in oil sands projects and either upgraded on-site or sold or transferred to affiliates. The BVM ensures that Alberta receives market value for its bitumen production, taken in cash or bitumen royalty-in-kind, through the royalty formula. Western Canadian Select (WCS), a grade or blend of Alberta bitumens, diluents (a product such as naphtha or condensate which is added to increase the ability of the oil to flow through a pipeline) and conventional heavy oils, developed by Alberta producers and stored and valued at Hardisty, AB was determined to be the best reference crude price in the development of a BVM."

By 2014 NRR revenue dropped to 21% of total revenue from 30% in 2010. The 2014 Provincial Budget reported that future anticipated NRR revenue is "far less than in 2011-2012, less than the 30% recorded in 2010 and in the four year period from 2005-06 to 2008-09."
 

Budget 2014 forecast that the 2014-2015 West Texas Intermediate (WTI) - Western Canadian Select (WCS)- differential, would be 26% with the WTI price at US$95.22. By December 2014 4 December 2014 WTI had dropped to $US67.25 bbl and WCS to US$50.70 with a differential of 16%.

References

External links
The website of the Ministry of Energy
The website of the Energy Resources Conservation Board
The website of the Alberta Utilities Commission

Energy
Alberta
Energy in Alberta